The 1975 NCAA men's volleyball tournament was the sixth annual tournament to determine the national champion of NCAA men's college volleyball. The tournament was played at Pauley Pavilion in Los Angeles, California.

UCLA defeated UC Santa Barbara,  3–1 (15–9, 7–15, 15–9, 15–10), to win their fifth national title. This was a rematch of the 1971 and 1974 title matches, both won by UCLA.

UCLA's John Bekins was named Most Outstanding Player of the tournament.

Qualification
Until the creation of the NCAA Men's Division III Volleyball Championship in 2012, there was only a single national championship for men's volleyball. As such, all NCAA men's volleyball programs (whether from Division I, Division II, or Division III) were eligible. A total of 4 teams were invited to contest this championship.

Tournament bracket 
Site: Pauley Pavilion, Los Angeles, California

All tournament team 
John Bekins, UCLA (Most outstanding player)
John Herren, UCLA
Joe Mica, UCLA
Marc Waldie, Ohio State
Jon Roberts, UC Santa Barbara
David DeGroot, UC Santa Barbara

See also 
 NCAA Men's National Collegiate Volleyball Championship

References

1975
NCAA Men's Volleyball Championship
NCAA Men's Volleyball Championship
1975 in sports in California
May 1975 sports events in the United States
Volleyball in California